Fudbalski klub Proleter Teslić (Serbian Cyrillic: Фудбалски клуб Пpoлeтep Tecлић) is a football club from Teslić, in Republika Srpska, Bosnia and Herzegovina. They play in the second division of the Republika Srpska championship. Until 2007 Proleter was playing in the 2nd division, when they qualified for the first league after 11 years. The club plays its home matches on the Radolinka stadium .

Proleter was founded in 1926 and played mostly in lower Yugoslav leagues.

Coaching history
 Ljubiša Tripunović
 Zoran Ćurguz
  Anto Petrović
 Darko Vojvodić
 Zoran Dujaković
 Mihajlo Bošnjak
 Nemanja Miljanović
 Darijan Grbić
 Zoran Ćurguz
 Nebojša Đekanović
 Mile Lazarević
 Nebojša Đekanović
 Zoran Dujaković (Piljar)

External sources
 FK Proleter Teslić at FSRS
 Club at RS Sport

Football clubs in Bosnia and Herzegovina
Football clubs in Republika Srpska
Teslić
Association football clubs established in 1926
1926 establishments in Bosnia and Herzegovina